Wil Wagner is an Australian singer, songwriter, guitar and keyboard player from Melbourne. He is the lead singer of The Smith Street Band.

Career
In April 2008, Wagner released Us Boys Run, credited to Wil Wagner & Friends.

In 2010, Wagner self-released the EP What Started Off With Trespassing.

In March 2013, Wagner released Laika.

In July 2015, Wagner released I Hope I Don't Come Across Intense on cassette only. In April 2020, the album was released  on other formats, which saw it debut at number 49 on the ARIA Charts; thus becoming Wagner's first solo charting album.

In February 2019, Wagner issued a public statement amid allegations of emotional abuse and support acts pulling out of Wagner's band (The Smith Street Band) national tour. Wagner issued a statement on his band's official Instagram account after emails dating back to 2013 were published on social media. Wagner said "I'm not hiding from anything, I said some incredibly hurtful things that I completely regret. I ask that you make up your own minds based on what has actually been said rather than form an opinion based on someone else's version." The band's statement went on to thank people for their support.

In September 2020, Wagner released Spiralling, a 7 track mini-album recorded at his bands off grid, solar powered studio, just before stage three restrictions were placed on regional Victoria. Spiralling was produced by Wil Wagner and recorded and mixed by The Smith Street Band's drummer Matt Bodiam and mastered by Joe Carra at Crystal Mastering.

In October 2021, Wagner released Live from a Beach House in the Rain, a live set recorded by Wagner in the spare room of a beach house. The album debuted at number 14 on the ARIA charts.

Discography

Studio albums

Live albums

Extended plays

References

21st-century Australian musicians
Living people
Musicians from Melbourne
1990 births